Gary John Blackford (born 25 September 1968) is an English former professional footballer who played in the Football League as a defender for Barnet.

References

External links

Career profile at Margate FC History

1968 births
Living people
People from Redhill, Surrey
English footballers
Association football defenders
Hendon F.C. players
Whyteleafe F.C. players
Croydon F.C. players
Barnet F.C. players
Brisbane Strikers FC players
Dagenham & Redbridge F.C. players
Enfield F.C. players
Slough Town F.C. players
Margate F.C. players
National League (English football) players
English Football League players
Redbridge Forest F.C. players
Fisher Athletic F.C. players
Lynn Fighting Knights men's soccer players